The 2019 Men's World Team Squash Championships was the 26th edition of world men's team championship for squash players. The event was held at Squash On Fire in Washington, D.C., United States, from 15 to 21 December 2019. The tournament was organized by U.S. Squash sanctioned by the World Squash Federation.

Participating teams 
A total of 23 teams competing from all the five confederations.

Seeds 
The seeds were announced on 2 December 2019.

Group stage

Pool A 

Egypt vs. United States

Egypt vs. Switzerland

United States vs. Switzerland

Pool B 

England vs. Canada

Wales vs. Nigeria

England vs. Wales

Canada vs. Nigeria

England vs. Nigeria

Wales vs. Canada

Pool C 

France vs. Colombia

Malaysia vs. South Korea

France vs. Malaysia

Colombia vs. South Korea

France vs. South Korea

Malaysia vs. Colombia

Pool D 

New Zealand vs. Ireland

Scotland vs. Singapore

New Zealand vs. Scotland

Ireland vs. Singapore

New Zealand vs. Singapore

Scotland vs. Ireland

Pool E 

Germany vs. Argentina

Spain vs. South Africa

Germany vs. Spain

Argentina vs. South Africa

Germany vs. South Africa

Spain vs. Argentina

Pool F 

Hong Kong vs. Jamaica

Australia vs. Kuwait

Hong Kong vs. Australia

Jamaica vs. Kuwait

Hong Kong vs. Kuwait

Australia vs. Jamaica

Second round

Thirteenth to twenty-third places 
13th to 23rd places bracket

17th to 20th places bracket

21st to 23rd places round-robin table

First to twelfth places 
1st to 12th places bracket

5th to 8th places bracket

9th to 12th places bracket

Round of 16

Quarterfinals

Semifinals

Final

Final standings

References 

World Squash Championships
2019 in squash
2019 in sports in Washington, D.C.
World Team Squash Championships
World Team Squash Championships